Sara or Sarah Jackson may refer to:

 Sarah Catherwood (born 1980), also known as Sarah Jackson, New Zealand Olympic swimmer
 Sarah Jackson (artist) (1924–2004), Canadian artist
 Sarah Jackson (soccer) (born 1991), American soccer player who played for Arna-Bjørnar
 Sarah Jackson (teacher) (1858–1946), New Zealand teacher, industrial school matron and manager, community leader
 Sarah Yorke Jackson (1803–1887), daughter-in-law of U.S. President Andrew Jackson
 Sara Dunlap Jackson (1919–1991), American archivist
 Sara Jackson-Holman, American singer-songwriter